A provincial episcopal visitor (PEV), popularly known as a flying bishop, is a Church of England bishop assigned to minister to many of the clergy, laity and parishes who on grounds of theological conviction, "are unable to receive the ministry of women bishops or priests". The system by which such bishops oversee certain churches is referred to as alternative episcopal oversight (AEO).

History

The Church of England ordained its first women priests in 1994. According to acts of the General Synod passed the previous year (Priests (Ordination of Women) Measure 1993), if a parish does not accept the ministry of women priests it can formally request that none be appointed to minister to it. Via the Episcopal Ministry Act of Synod 1993, if the local bishop has participated in the ordination of women as priests, a parish can request to be under the pastoral and sacramental care of another bishop who has not participated in such ordinations. In such a case the parish still remains in the diocese of the local diocesan bishop, at whose invitation the "flying bishop" makes his visitation.

On 4 December 2014, it was announced that the see of Maidstone would be filled again in order to provide a further provincial episcopal visitor for particular conservative evangelical members of the Church of England who take a complementarian view on headship.

The act empowers the metropolitans of the Church of England's two provinces to appoint provincial episcopal visitors as suffragan bishops whose main purpose is to be available for such visits to parishes across the province. Accordingly, four PEV bishops have been appointed across the two provinces.

In December 2010, the bishops of Richborough and Ebbsfleet resigned to join the Roman Catholic Church. On 5 May 2011, their successors as PEVs were announced. In September 2021 Jonathan Goodall, the bishop of Ebbsfleet, also resigned to join the Roman Catholic church.

In June 2022, it was announced that, from January 2023, oversight of conservative Catholics in the west of Canterbury province (formerly the Bishop of Ebbsfleet's area) would be taken by a new Bishop of Oswestry, suffragan to the Bishop of Lichfield; while oversight of conservative Evangelicals (formerly the duties of a Bishop suffragan of Maidstone) would be taken by the next Bishop of Ebbsfleet.

List of PEV bishops

Province of Canterbury
In the Province of Canterbury:

The Bishop suffragan of Richborough: Norman Banks
The Bishop suffragan of Oswestry: Paul Thomas
The Bishop suffragan of Ebbsfleet: Rob Munro
Diocese of London: the bishop has designated the suffragan Bishop of Fulham (Jonathan Baker). Additionally, he performs a similar role as an assistant bishop licensed in the neighbouring diocese of Southwark. During the 2010–2013 vacancy in the see of Fulham, those duties were temporarily assigned to then-Bishop of Edmonton Peter Wheatley.

Province of York
In the Province of York:

The Bishop suffragan of Ebbsfleet: Rob Munro
The Bishop suffragan of Beverley: Stephen Race

, the Bishop of Beverley ministered in 10 of the 12 dioceses in the northern province. The other two dioceses use different suffragan bishops: 
Leeds: the area Bishop of Wakefield (Tony Robinson)
Blackburn: the Bishop of Burnley (Philip North)

Oversight areas

Until the appointment of Paul Ferguson in 2014, the Bishop of Whitby provided AEO in York diocese; with Ferguson's appointment that oversight lapses to the Bishop of Beverley as PEV. Following the retirement of John Goddard, Bishop of Burnley, on 19 July 2014, it was announced that Philip North would be consecrated as the next Bishop of Burnley on 2 February 2015 and would have AEO in the dioceses of Blackburn and Carlisle; however, while North is now listed as the AEO bishop for Blackburn diocese, Webster is listed for Carlisle.

, in the southern province, the bishops of Ebbsfleet and of Richborough together ministered in 27 of the 30 dioceses. Of the three remaining dioceses, London and Southwark were ministered to by the Bishop of Fulham and Chichester by its diocesan bishop. The Bishop of Ebbsfleet served the western 13 dioceses (Bath and Wells, Birmingham, Bristol, Coventry, Derby, Exeter, Gloucester, Hereford, Lichfield, Oxford, Salisbury, Truro and Worcester) while the Bishop of Richborough served the eastern half (Canterbury, Chelmsford, Ely, Europe, Guildford, St Edmundsbury & Ipswich, Leicester, Lincoln, Norwich, Peterborough, Portsmouth, Rochester, St Albans and Winchester).

By January 2018, 114 parishes had passed resolutions for conservative evangelical reasons; 53 of these had requested AEO from the Bishop of Maidstone. Rod Thomas is an assistant bishop in the Dioceses of Birmingham, Bristol, Carlisle, Chelmsford, Chester, Derby, Ely, London, Manchester, Norwich, Portsmouth, Rochester, Sheffield and Southwark.

The resignation of Jonathan Goodall as bishop of Ebbsfleet, and the retirement of the Bishop of Beverley, has left two of the four flying bishop appointments vacant. It was suggested by church insiders  that fewer candidates were becoming available for the posts as female clergy had become accepted by the vast majority of churchgoers. In June 2022, it was announced that, from January 2023, oversight of traditionalist Catholics in the west of Canterbury province (formerly the Bishop of Ebbsfleet's area) would be taken by a new Bishop of Oswestry, suffragan to the Bishop of Lichfield; while oversight of conservative Evangelicals would be taken by the next Bishop of Ebbsfleet; the See of Maidstone would be left vacant, available for other uses.

Church in Wales
In the Church in Wales, David Thomas was appointed to the comparable office of Provincial Assistant Bishop in 1996 when the province voted to ordain women to the priesthood. No successor was appointed when Thomas retired in 2008.

See also
 List of Anglo-Catholic churches in England
 Apostolic visitor
 Canonical visitation

References

External links
Bishop of Ebbsfleet's website
See of Beverley website
Bishop of Richborough's website

Anglican episcopal offices
Non-diocesan Anglican bishops
Ordination of women in the Anglican Communion
Anglo-Catholicism
Ecclesiastical titles
Canon law of the Anglican Communion